Potoky is a village and municipality in Stropkov District in the Prešov Region of north-eastern Slovakia.

History 
In historical records the village was first mentioned in 1551.

Geography 
The municipality lies at an altitude of 246 metres and covers an area of 5.582 km². It has a population of about 92 people.

External links 
 
 
 http://www.statistics.sk/mosmis/eng/run.html

Villages and municipalities in Stropkov District
Šariš